Flirting with Twilight is a 2001 studio album by Kurt Elling.

Reception

The Allmusic review by David R. Adler awarded the album four stars, and described it as "a worthy statement from Elling, who shows yet again that vocal jazz can be more than just easy listening"

Flirting with Twilight received a Grammy Award for Best Jazz Vocal Album, the fifth nomination in a row since Elling's debut. In addition, "Easy Living" was nominated for the Grammy Award for Best Arrangement, Instrumental and Vocals.

Track listing
 "Moonlight Serenade" (Glenn Miller, Mitchell Parish) - 4:22
 "Detour Ahead" (Herb Ellis, Johnny Frigo, Lou Carter) - 5:34
 "You Don't Know What Love Is" (Don Raye, Gene de Paul) - 5:36
 "Orange Blossoms in Summertime" (Curtis Lundy, Kurt Elling) - 6:33
 "Not While I'm Around" (Stephen Sondheim) - 6:26
 "Easy Living" (Leo Robin, Ralph Rainger) - 5:22
 "Lil' Darlin'" (Neal Hefti, Jon Hendricks) - 5:40
 "I Get Along Without You Very Well" (Hoagy Carmichael, Jane Brown Thompson) - 3:37
 "Blame It on My Youth" (Edward Heyman, Oscar Levant) - 3:27
 "I'm Thru with Love" (Matty Malneck, Fud Livingston, Gus Kahn) - 4:57
 "Say It" (Jimmy McHugh, Frank Loesser) - 4:57
 "While You Are Mine" (F. Simon, Elling) - 7:46
 "Je tire ma révérence" (Pascal Bastia) - 3:39

Personnel
Kurt Elling - vocals, arranger
Laurence Hobgood - piano, arranger
Clay Jenkins - trumpet
Bob Shepard - soprano saxophone, tenor saxophone
Jeff Clayton - alto saxophone
Marc Johnson - double bass
Peter Erskine - drums
Production
Kurt Elling, Laurence Hobgood and Bill Traut - producers
Al Schmitt - recording engineer, mixing
John Hendrickson - recording engineer
Robert Hadley and Doug Sax - mastering
Kurt Elling - art direction
Edward Odowd - design
John Fraser - collage
Tiffany Pemberton - photography
Zan Stewart - liner notes

References

Blue Note Records albums
Kurt Elling albums
2001 albums